The Party of Greens of Mozambique (PVM) is a political party formed in 1997. Before the 1999 elections the party split in two factions over whether to support the RENAMO-Electoral Union. In the 2004 elections the party gained 0.33% of the vote, and in 2009 the party received 0.50%.

References

Political parties in Mozambique
Green parties in Africa
Political parties established in 1997